Megalobrimus granulipennis is a species of beetle in the family Cerambycidae. It was described by Stephan von Breuning in 1954. It is known from Tanzania.

References

Endemic fauna of Tanzania
Phrissomini
Beetles described in 1954